The 2010 Kalgoorlie-Boulder earthquake was a 5.2  earthquake that occurred near the city of Kalgoorlie-Boulder, Western Australia on 20 April 2010, at approximately 8:17 am WST.

The earthquake caused major damage to the historic buildings in Kalgoorlie-Boulder. It was also the largest recorded in the Goldfields region in terms of magnitude and one of the largest in Australia in terms of resulting damage. No one was killed but two people were treated at Kalgoorlie Hospital for minor injuries resulting from the earthquake. It resulted in the temporary closure of local gold mines including the Super Pit gold mine.

See also
 Earthquakes in Western Australia
 List of earthquakes in 2010
 List of earthquakes in Australia

References

External links
 Australian Goldfields rocked by largest earthquake in 50 years – Times Online
 Biggest quake in 50 years hits Australia's Goldfields – Agence France-Presse
 Moderate earthquake rattles Western Australia Goldfields – Herald Sun

Australia
Kalgoorlie-Boulder earthquake
April 2010 events in Australia
Earthquakes in Western Australia
Goldfields-Esperance
2010s in Western Australia